Island Captives is a 1937 American adventure film directed by Paul Kerschner and written by Al Martin. The film stars Edward Nugent, Joan Barclay, Henry Brandon, Charles King, Forrest Taylor and Carmen Laroux. The film was released on July 22, 1937, by William Steiner. This film is in the public domain.

Plot
The story follows Helen Carsons whose father was recently murdered and Tom Willoughby who is the son of the murderer, as they get shipwrecked in a jungle island that serves as headquarters of a smuggling ring.

Cast          
Edward Nugent as Tom Willoughby 
Joan Barclay as Helen Carsons
Henry Brandon as Dick Bannister
Charles King as Kelly
Forrest Taylor as Hudson
Carmen Laroux as Taino 
Frederick Farmer as Graham
John Beck as Carsons
John Sheehan as Police Captain

References

External links
 
 

1937 films
American adventure films
1937 adventure films
American black-and-white films
1930s English-language films
1930s American films